Fehrman is a surname. Notable people with the surname include:

Carl Fehrman (1915–2010), Swedish literary historian
Trevor Fehrman (born 1981), American actor and writer

See also
Fährmann

English-language surnames